Joseph Blás de Gainza (c.1725-1790s) was a Spanish merchant, military man and politician, who served as mayor of Buenos Aires.

Biography 
Gainza was born in Gipuzkoa, Spain, the son of Pedro de Gainza and Teresa de Leyza. He was married to María Teresa de Eguía y San Martín, daughter of Juan de Eguía, born in Navarra, and Jerónima Isabel de San Martín, belonging to an illustrious family of Buenos Aires. 

Joseph Blás de Gainza was consul of the Commerce Consulate of Buenos Aires, and served as alcalde of first vote of the city on two occasions. His first term was in 1763, and the second in 1779 during the Viceroyalty of the Río de la Plata. He was also acting mayor in substitution of Manuel Antonio Warnes.

References 

1725 births
1790s deaths
People from San Sebastián
People from Buenos Aires
Spanish politicians
Mayors of Buenos Aires
Spanish colonial governors and administrators